Pat Mora (born January 19, 1942 in El Paso, Texas) is an American poet and author of books for adults, teens and children.  Her grandparents came to El Paso from northern Mexico. A graduate of the University of Texas at El Paso, she received Honorary Doctorates from North Carolina State University and SUNY Buffalo, and is an Honorary Member of the American Library Association. A literacy advocate, in 1996, she founded Children's Day, Book Day, in Spanish, El día de los niños, El día de los libros now celebrated across the country each year on April 30.

Career
Pat Mora taught for the El Paso Public Schools, the El Paso Community College, and the University of Texas at El Paso where she then became Assistant to the Vice President for Academic Affairs and later Assistant to the President.

Writing
Mora began professionally writing in the early 1980s. She has produced writing for all age groups, creating picture books, poetry and biographies. Her choice of subject matter and theme is often shaped by life on the Mexico–United States border where she was born and spent much of her life. she says: "The desert, mi madre, is my stern teacher...The Southwestern landscape has been my world, my point of reference." Her writing highlights the human and cultural diversity of the southwestern United States and northern Mexico. She writes of the rich sense of "diversity within Mexican American experience." Mora celebrates diversity and is opposed to the idea of an American monoculture; therefore, she is very concerned with preserving cultural heritage: "I write because I believe that Mexican Americans need to take their rightful place in U.S. literature. We need to be published and to be studied in schools and colleges so that the stories and ideas of our people won't quietly disappear."

Mora is a strong advocate of bilingual literacy. Early in her career, she coined a concept she named "bookjoy" which describes the pleasure of reading.

Mora's style of writing often incorporates code-switching between English and Spanish words. As a writer, she allows a free-flow of ideas in her first draft: she doesn't question her motivation for writing and writes using "as little conscious analysis as possible." She prefers to use her critical eye for editing her own work later.

Mora has collaborated with her daughter, Libby Martinez, on two children's books: I Pledge Allegiance and Bravo, Chico Canta! Bravo!, for which Martinez is the illustrator.

Children's Day, Book Day
In the mid-nineties, Mora founded the community-based, family literacy initiative, El día de los niños, El día de los libros/Children's Day, Book Day (Día). In 1997, she received the official endorsement of REFORMA, the National Association to Promote Library and Information Services to Latinos and the Spanish-Speaking for the project. Mora based Dia on Mexican National Children's Day festivities held since 1925. The two part celebration of Día includes a commitment to promote literacy and bookjoy, and culminates in book celebrations that unite communities. When choosing a date to kick off Día, she chose April 30 because it was the last day of National Poetry month. The first Dia took place in 1996.

Children's Day, Book Day, has grown in the U.S. to include all children, languages and cultures. Mora has expressed the desire to have books, celebrations and materials for Día to include "all languages spoken in the United States."

In 2004, the Association for Library Services to Children's (ALSC) division of the American Library Association became an active partner for Dia. Mora says, "If we want our nation to be a country of readers...[we] need to work together to inspire communities in nurturing reading families."../

Awards 

Texas Writer Award (2015)
International Latino Book Award, Best Children's Fiction Picture Book: The Beautiful Lady: Our Lady of Guadalupe, (2013).
Loretto Legacy Award for Arts and Literature (2012).
Con Tinta Achievement for Literary Activism from Association of Writers & Writing Programs (2012)
Gelett Burgess Children's Book Award: Gracias~Thanks, (2011).
Eureka! Children's Nonfiction Award, Silver Honor, California Reading Association: Dizzy in Your Eyes: Poems About Love, (2010).
Literary Legacy Award, El Paso Community College (2010).
International Latino Book Award for Best Children's Picture Book in English: Abuelos, (2009).
Mountains & Plains Independent Booksellers Association Poetry Award, Adobe Odes, (2008).
Bronze Medal in Poetry, Independent Publisher Book Awards: Adobe Odes, (2008).
Border Regional Library Association, Southwest Book Award: House of Houses, (2008).
Luis Leal (writer) Award for Distinction in Chicano/Latino Letters, University of California at Santa Barbara (2008).
International Latino Book Award, Best Poetry in English: Adobe Odes, (2007).
Robert Long Medal for Distinuguished Contributions to Celebrating the Cultural Diversity of Children, University of Alabama at Birmingham (2007).
Pura Belpré Honor Award for narrative: Doña Flor: A Tall Tale about a Giant Woman with a Great Big Heart, (2006).
National Hispanic Cultural Center Literary Award (2006).
Amelia Bloomer Project Recommended List: A Library for Juana: The World of Sor Juana Inéz, (2004).
Arizona Governor's Book Award: Confetti: Poems for Children, (2004).
Pellicer-Frost Bi-national Poetry Award, Ford Foundation, FEMAP Foundation and Museo de Arte e Historia del INBA-Cd. Juarez, (1999).
Fahd Elbadry Southwest Book Award: A Birthday Basket for Tia, (1992).
Poetry Award, Conference of Cincinnati Women (1990).
El Paso Herald-Post Writer's Hall of Fame Inductee (1988).
Kellogg National Fellowship Leadership Award (1986).
Border Regional Library Association Award: Borders (1986).
Border Regional Library Association Award: Chants (1984).
Southwest Council of Latin American Studies, Harvey L. Johnson Award (1984).
National Association for Chicano Studies, Creative Writing Award (1983).

Mora has received Honorary Doctorates in Letters from North Carolina State University and SUNY Buffalo and is an Honorary Member of the American Library Association.  She was a recipient of a Civitella Ranieri Fellowship to write in Umbria, Italy. She was a Visiting Carruthers Chair at the University of New Mexico, a recipient and judge of the Poetry Fellowships from the National Endowment for the Arts, and a recipient and advisor of the Kellogg National Fellowships.

Bibliography

Adult Books: Nonfiction

Young Adult Books: Poetry

La Migra

Children's Books:

Bravo, Chico Canta! Bravo!
The Desert Is My Mother/El desierto es mi madre(bilingual)
Abuelos
The Bakery Lady/La señora de la panaderia (bilingual)
Listen to the Desert: Oye al desierto
My Family/Mi Familia series: Here Kitty, Kitty/¡Ven gatita, ven! (bilingual)
The Night the Moon Fell

Family 
Pat Mora raised her 3 children and worked in El Paso until 1989, when she moved to Cincinnati, Ohio. She is married to Vern Scarborough, a professor of anthropology. She lives in Santa Fe, New Mexico.

References

External links

 
 
 

1942 births
Living people
American children's writers
American poets of Mexican descent
American women poets
People from El Paso, Texas
American women children's writers
Writers from Santa Fe, New Mexico
Writers from Texas
21st-century American women